A neodymium magnet (also known as NdFeB, NIB or Neo magnet) is the most widely used type of rare-earth magnet.
It is a permanent magnet made from an alloy of neodymium, iron, and boron to form the Nd2Fe14B tetragonal crystalline structure. Developed independently in 1984 by General Motors and Sumitomo Special Metals, neodymium magnets are the strongest type of permanent magnet available commercially.

NdFeB magnets can be classified as sintered or bonded, depending on the manufacturing process used. They have replaced other types of magnets in many applications in modern products that require strong permanent magnets, such as electric motors in cordless tools, hard disk drives and magnetic fasteners.

History 
General Motors (GM) and Sumitomo Special Metals independently discovered the Nd2Fe14B compound almost simultaneously in 1984.  The research was initially driven by the high raw materials cost of SmCo permanent magnets, which had been developed earlier. GM focused on the development of melt-spun nanocrystalline Nd2Fe14B magnets, while Sumitomo developed full-density sintered Nd2Fe14B magnets.

GM commercialized its inventions of isotropic Neo powder, bonded neo magnets, and the related production processes by founding Magnequench in 1986 (Magnequench has since become part of Neo Materials Technology, Inc., which later merged into Molycorp). The company supplied melt-spun Nd2Fe14B powder to bonded magnet manufacturers. The Sumitomo facility became part of the Hitachi Corporation, and has manufactured but also licensed other companies to produce sintered Nd2Fe14B magnets. Hitachi has held more than 600 patents covering neodymium magnets.

Chinese manufacturers have become a dominant force in neodymium magnet production, based on their control of much of the world's rare-earth mines.

The United States Department of Energy has identified a need to find substitutes for rare-earth metals in permanent magnet technology and has funded such research. The Advanced Research Projects Agency-Energy has sponsored a Rare Earth Alternatives in Critical Technologies (REACT) program, to develop alternative materials. In 2011, ARPA-E awarded 31.6 million dollars to fund Rare-Earth Substitute projects. Because of its role in permanent magnets used for wind turbines, it has been argued that neodymium will be one of the main objects of geopolitical competition in a world running on renewable energy. This perspective has been criticized for failing to recognize that most wind turbines do not use permanent magnets and for underestimating the power of economic incentives for expanded production.

Explanation of strength 
In its pure form, neodymium has magnetic properties—specifically, it is antiferromagnetic—but only at low temperatures, below .  But some compounds of neodymium with transition metals such as iron are ferromagnetic, with Curie temperatures well above room temperature.  These are used to make neodymium magnets.

The strength of neodymium magnets is the result of several factors.  The most important is that the tetragonal Nd2Fe14B crystal structure has exceptionally high uniaxial magnetocrystalline anisotropy (HA ≈ 7T –
magnetic field strength H in units of A/m versus magnetic moment in A·m2).  This means a crystal of the material preferentially magnetizes along a specific crystal axis but is very difficult to magnetize in other directions.  Like other magnets, the neodymium magnet alloy is composed of microcrystalline grains which are aligned in a powerful magnetic field during manufacture so their magnetic axes all point in the same direction.  The resistance of the crystal lattice to turning its direction of magnetization gives the compound a very high coercivity, or resistance to being demagnetized.

The neodymium atom can have a large magnetic dipole moment because it has 4 unpaired electrons in its electron structure as opposed to (on average) 3 in iron.  In a magnet it is the unpaired electrons, aligned so that their spin is in the same direction, which generate the magnetic field.  This gives the Nd2Fe14B compound a high saturation magnetization (Js ≈ 1.6T or 16kG) and a remanent magnetization of typically 1.3 teslas.  Therefore, as the maximum energy density is proportional to Js2, this magnetic phase has the potential for storing large amounts of magnetic energy (BHmax ≈ 512kJ/m3 or 64MG·Oe). 

This magnetic energy value is about 18 times greater than "ordinary" ferrite magnets by volume and 12 times by mass.  This magnetic energy property is higher in NdFeB alloys than in samarium cobalt (SmCo) magnets, which were the first type of rare-earth magnet to be commercialized. In practice, the magnetic properties of neodymium magnets depend on the alloy composition, microstructure, and manufacturing technique employed.

The Nd2Fe14B crystal structure can be described as alternating layers of iron atoms and a neodymium-boron compound. The diamagnetic boron atoms do not contribute directly to the magnetism but improve cohesion by strong covalent bonding.  The relatively low rare earth content (12% by volume, 26.7% by mass) and the relative abundance of neodymium and iron compared with samarium and cobalt makes neodymium magnets lower in price than samarium-cobalt magnets.

Properties

Grades 
Neodymium magnets are graded according to their maximum energy product, which relates to the magnetic flux output per unit volume. Higher values indicate stronger magnets. For sintered NdFeB magnets, there is a widely recognized international classification. Their values range from 28 up to 52. The first letter N before the values is short for neodymium, meaning sintered NdFeB magnets. Letters following the values indicate intrinsic coercivity and maximum operating temperatures (positively correlated with the Curie temperature), which range from default (up to ) to TH.

Grades of sintered NdFeB magnets:

 N30 – N55
 N30M – N50M
 N30H – N50H
 N30SH – N48SH
 N30UH – N42UH
 N28EH – N40EH
 N28TH – N35TH

Magnetic properties 
Some important properties used to compare permanent magnets are:

Remanence (Br), which measures the strength of the magnetic field.
Coercivity (Hci), the material's resistance to becoming demagnetized.
Maximum energy product (BHmax), the density of magnetic energy, characterized by the maximum value of magnetic flux density(B) times magnetic field strength (H).
Curie temperature (TC), the temperature at which the material loses its magnetism.

Neodymium magnets have higher remanence, much higher coercivity and energy product, but often lower Curie temperature than other types of magnets. Special neodymium magnet alloys that include terbium and dysprosium have been developed that have higher Curie temperature, allowing them to tolerate higher temperatures. The table below compares the magnetic performance of neodymium magnets with other types of permanent magnets.

Physical and mechanical properties

Corrosion problems

Sintered Nd2Fe14B tends to be vulnerable to corrosion, especially along grain boundaries of a sintered magnet. This type of corrosion can cause serious deterioration, including crumbling of a magnet into a powder of small magnetic particles, or spalling of a surface layer.

This vulnerability is addressed in many commercial products by adding a protective coating to prevent exposure to the atmosphere. Nickel, nickel-copper-nickel and zinc platings are the standard methods, although plating with other metals, or polymer and lacquer protective coatings, are also in use.

Temperature effects 
Neodymium has a negative coefficient, meaning the coercivity along with the magnetic energy density (BHmax) decreases with temperature. Neodymium-iron-boron magnets have high coercivity at room temperature, but as the temperature rises above , the coercivity decreases drastically until the Curie temperature (around ). This fall in coercivity limits the efficiency of the magnet under high-temperature conditions such as in wind turbines, hybrid motors, etc. Dysprosium (Dy) or terbium (Tb) is added to curb the fall in performance from temperature changes, making the magnet even more expensive.

Hazards 
The greater forces exerted by rare-earth magnets create hazards that may not occur with other types of magnet. Neodymium magnets larger than a few cubic centimeters are strong enough to cause injuries to body parts pinched between two magnets, or a magnet and a ferrous metal surface, even causing broken bones.

Magnets that get too near each other can strike each other with enough force to chip and shatter the brittle magnets, and the flying chips can cause various injuries, especially eye injuries. There have even been cases where young children who have swallowed several magnets have had sections of the digestive tract pinched between two magnets, causing injury or death. Also this could be a serious health risk if working with machines that have magnets in or attached to them. 

The stronger magnetic fields can be hazardous to mechanical and electronic devices, as they can erase magnetic media such as floppy disks and credit cards, and magnetize watches and the shadow masks of CRT type monitors at a greater distance than other types of magnet. In some cases, chipped magnets can act as a fire hazard as they come together, sending sparks flying as if they were a lighter flint, because some neodymium magnets contain ferrocerium.

Production 
There are two principal neodymium magnet manufacturing methods:

 Classical powder metallurgy or sintered magnet process
Sintered Nd-magnets are prepared by the raw materials being melted in a furnace, cast into a mold and cooled to form ingots. The ingots are pulverized and milled; the powder is then sintered into dense blocks. The blocks are then heat-treated, cut to shape, surface treated and magnetized.
 Rapid solidification or bonded magnet process
Bonded Nd-magnets are prepared by melt spinning a thin ribbon of the NdFeB alloy. The ribbon contains randomly oriented Nd2Fe14B nano-scale grains. This ribbon is then pulverized into particles, mixed with a polymer, and either compression- or injection-molded into bonded magnets.

In 2015, Nitto Denko Corporation of Japan announced their development of a new method of sintering neodymium magnet material. The method exploits an "organic/inorganic hybrid technology" to form a clay-like mixture that can be fashioned into various shapes for sintering.  Most importantly, it is said to be possible to control a non-uniform orientation of the magnetic field in the sintered material to locally concentrate the field to, e.g., improve the performance of electric motors. Mass production is planned for 2017.

As of 2012, 50,000tons of neodymium magnets are produced officially each year in China, and 80,000tons in a "company-by-company" build-up done in 2013. China produces more than 95% of rare earth elements and produces about 76% of the world's total rare-earth magnets, as well as most of the world's neodymium.

Applications

Existing magnet applications 

Neodymium magnets have replaced alnico and ferrite magnets in many of the myriad applications in modern technology where strong permanent magnets are required, because their greater strength allows the use of smaller, lighter magnets for a given application. Some examples are:

 Head actuators for computer hard disks
 Mechanical e-cigarette firing switches
 Locks for doors
 Loudspeakers and headphones
 Mobile phone speakers, taptic feedback and auto focus actuators
 Magnetic bearings and couplings
 Benchtop NMR spectrometers
 Electric motors
 Cordless tools
 Servomotors
 Lifting and compressor motors
 Synchronous motors
 Spindle and stepper motors
 Electrical power steering
 Drive motors for hybrid and electric vehicles. The electric motors of each Toyota Prius require  of neodymium.
 Actuators

 Electric generators for wind turbines (only those with permanent magnet excitation)
 Voice coil
 Retail media case decouplers
 In process industries, powerful neodymium magnets are used to catch foreign bodies and protect product and processes

New applications 

The greater strength of neodymium magnets has inspired new applications in areas where magnets were not used before, such as magnetic jewelry clasps, children's magnetic building sets (and other neodymium magnet toys) and as part of the closing mechanism of modern sport parachute equipment. They are the main metal in the formerly popular desk-toy magnets, "Buckyballs" and "Buckycubes", though some U.S. retailers have chosen not to sell them because of child-safety concerns, and they have been banned in Canada for the same reason.

The strength and magnetic field homogeneity on neodymium magnets has also opened new applications in the medical field with the introduction of open magnetic resonance imaging (MRI) scanners used to image the body in radiology departments as an alternative to superconducting magnets that use a coil of superconducting wire to produce the magnetic field.

Neodymium magnets are used as a surgically placed anti-reflux system which is a band of magnets surgically implanted around the lower esophageal sphincter to treat gastroesophageal reflux disease (GERD). They have also been implanted in the fingertips in order to provide sensory perception of magnetic fields, though this is an experimental procedure only popular among biohackers and grinders.

See also

References

Further reading 
 MMPA 0100-00, Standard Specifications for Permanent Magnet Materials
 K.H.J. Buschow (1998) Permanent-Magnet Materials and their Applications, Trans Tech Publications Ltd., Switzerland, 
 
 
 
 The Dependence of Magnetic Properties and Hot Workability of Rare Earth-Iron-Boride Magnets Upon Composition.

External links 
 
 Geeky Rare-Earth Magnets Repel Sharks
 Concern as China clamps down on rare earth exports
What Are Neodymium Magnets?

Ferromagnetic materials
Loudspeaker technology
Magnetic alloys
Magnetic levitation
Rare earth alloys
Types of magnets
Borides
Neodymium compounds
Ferrous alloys
Japanese inventions